William Bagrou (born June 19, 1996) is an American professional soccer player who plays as a forward.

Career 
Bagrou played four years of college soccer at Mercer University between 2014 and 2017, making 84 appearances, scoring 37 goals and tallying 16 assists. While at college, Bagrou played for USL PDL side Seattle Sounders FC U-23 in 2017.

On January 21, 2018, Bagrou was selected 75th overall in the 2018 MLS SuperDraft by Sporting Kansas City. However, he was not signed by the club, instead spending 2018 with PDL sides Northern Virginia United and Birmingham Hammers.

Bagrou signed professional terms with USL League One side Orlando City B in February 2019. He made his debut for the team on March 30, 2019 in the season-opening 3–1 defeat to FC Tucson.

In February 2020, Bagrou signed with Austrian third division club Stadl-Paura.

References

External links 
 
 
 Will Bagrou at Mercer

1996 births
Living people
People from Dacula, Georgia
Sportspeople from the Atlanta metropolitan area
Soccer players from Georgia (U.S. state)
Soccer players from Utah
American soccer players
Association football forwards
Mercer Bears men's soccer players
National Premier Soccer League players
Seattle Sounders FC U-23 players
Sporting Kansas City draft picks
Orlando City B players
USL League One players
USL League Two players